The North American continent is home to a wide variety of carnivorous plant species. Species from seven genera are native to the continent, and three of these genera are found nowhere else on the planet.

Genera and species 

Catopsis
Catopsis berteroniana

Darlingtonia
Darlingtonia californica

Dionea
Dionea muscipula

Drosera
Drosera anglica
Drosera brevifolia
Drosera capillaris
Drosera filiformis
Drosera intermedia
Drosera linearis
Drosera rotundifolia
Drosera tracyi

Sarracenia
Sarracenia alabamensis
Sarracenia alata
Sarracenia flava
Sarracenia jonesii
Sarracenia leucophylla
Sarracenia minor
Sarracenia oreophila
Sarracenia psittacina
Sarracenia purpurea
Sarracenia rosea
Sarracenia rubra

Pinguicula
Pinguicula acuminata
Pinguicula conzattii
Pinguicula elizabethiae
Pinguicula filifolia
Pinguicula gigantea
Pinguicula gypsicola
Pinguicula ionantha
Pinguicula laxifolia
Pinguicula lippoldii
Pinguicula lithophytica
Pinguicula lutea
Pinguicula moranensis
Pinguicula orchidioides
Pinguicula primuliflora
Pinguicula toldensis
Pinguicula vulgaris

Utricularia
Utricularia amethystina
Utricularia breviscapa
Utricularia cornuta
Utricularia floridana
Utricularia foliosa
Utricularia geminiscapa
Utricularia gibba
Utricularia hintonii
Utricularia hispida
Utricularia hydrocarpa
Utricularia inflata
Utricularia intermedia
Utricularia juncea
Utricularia macrorhiza
Utricularia minor
Utricularia ochroleuca
Utricularia olivacea
Utricularia perversa
Utricularia petersoniae
Utricularia purpurea
Utricularia pusilla
Utricularia radiata
Utricularia regia
Utricularia resupinata
Utricularia simulans
Utricularia striata
Utricularia stygia
Utricularia subulata
Utricularia vulgaris

References